Łodygowice  is a village in Żywiec County, Silesian Voivodeship, in southern Poland. It is the seat of the gmina (administrative district) called Gmina Łodygowice. The village has a population of 6,925.

It is one of the oldest villages in Żywiec Basin. It was established in the 13th century, and in the early 14th century belonged to the Cistercian monastery in Rudy.

Notable people
 Wojciech Kania, Polish military officer

References

Villages in Żywiec County